Ada bridge may refer to:
 Ada Bridge in Belgrade, Serbia
 Ada Covered Bridge in Michigan, US